Bronte, a locality in the Tasman District of New Zealand, lies between Richmond and Māpua.

Admiral  Horatio Nelson (1758-1805), the eponym of the Nelson Region, became Duke of Bronte (in  Sicily)
in 1799.
(The Bronte area in New Zealand formed part of the former Nelson Province from 1853 to 1876, and subsequently part of the Nelson Provincial District prior to the formation of the Tasman District in 1992.)

References

Populated places in the Tasman District
Populated places around Tasman Bay / Te Tai-o-Aorere